The National Front is a far-right Greek nationalist political party. It has been active from 2012.

It is led by Manos Konstas.

Election results

European Parliament

References

 Daniel Perdurant, "Antisemitism in Contemporary Greek Society", Analysis of Current Trends in antisemitism 7 (1995).

External links
  

Nationalist parties in Greece
Political parties established in 2012
2012 establishments in Greece